Peter Watson may refer to:

Peter William Watson (1761–1830), English merchant and botanist
Peter Watson (shoemaker) (fl. 1824), shoemaker and political activist, Chester-le-Street, England
Peter Watson (arts benefactor) (1908–1956), British art collector, benefactor and publisher
Peter Watson (ophthalmologist) (1930–2017), British ophthalmologist
Peter Watson (footballer, born 1934) (1934–2013), English footballer for Nottingham Forest and Southend United
Peter Watson (footballer, born 1935) (1935–2016), English footballer for Workington
Peter Watson (bishop) (born 1936), Anglican Archbishop of Melbourne, 2000–2005
Peter Watson (musician) (born 1941), rock guitarist and member of English 1960s band The Action
Peter Watson (intellectual historian) (born 1943), English intellectual historian and author
Peter Watson (footballer, born 1944), Northern Irish footballer
Peter Watson (politician) (born 1947), member of the Western Australian parliament
Peter Watson (cyclist) (born 1950), English cyclist
Peter Watson (photographer) (born 1952), British landscape photographer